Just Won't Burn is second studio album by American blues artist Susan Tedeschi, released in 1998. This album had national success in 1998.

Track listing
"Rock Me Right" (Tom Hambridge) – 4:27
"You Need to Be With Me" (Tedeschi) – 3:04
"Little by Little" (Junior Wells) – 3:49
"It Hurt So Bad" (Tom Hambridge) – 4:50
"Found Someone New" (Tedeschi) – 2:20
"Looking for Answers" (Tedeschi) – 5:13
"Can't Leave You Alone" (Adrienne Hayes) – 3:02
"Just Won't Burn" (Tedeschi) – 4:46
"Mama, He Treats Your Daughter Mean" (Herb Lance, Charlie Singleton, John Wallace) – 4:43
"Angel from Montgomery" (John Prine) – 5:23
"Friar's Point" (Tom Hambridge, Tedeschi) – 4:21

Personnel
Susan Tedeschi - guitar, piano, vocals, slide guitar, Soloist
Tino Barker - baritone saxophone
Gordon Beadle - tenor saxophone
Sean Costello - guitar, lead guitar, soloist
Norm DeMoura - bass
Tim Gearan - slide guitar
Tom Hambridge - percussion, drums, tambourine, timbales, background vocals
Adrienne Hayes - guitar, electric guitar, rhythm guitar
Ian Kennedy - fiddle
Jim Lamond - bass
Mike Levesque - drums
Annie Raines - harmonica
Bird Taylor - background vocals
Buck Taylor - background vocals
Tom West - piano, Hammond organ

Production
Producers: Susan Tedeschi, Tom Hambridge
Executive producer: Richard Rosenblatt
Associate producers: Susan Tedeschi, Ducky Carlisle
Engineers: Brian Capouch, Sean Carberry, Ducky Carlisle, Chris Rival
Mixing: Brian Capouch, Sean Carberry, Ducky Carlisle
Mastering: Dr. Toby Mountain
Assistant: Ducky Carlisle
Art direction: Diane Menyuk
Photography: Ron Pownall
Liner notes: Bob Vorel

Charts
Album - Billboard (United States)

Singles - Billboard (United States)

References

Susan Tedeschi albums
1998 albums